Nixon Lake is a lake in Wright County, in the U.S. state of Minnesota.

Nixon Lake bears the name of a local pioneer settler.

There is also a Nixon Lake in Vilas County, Wisconsin.

See also
List of lakes in Minnesota

References

Lakes of Minnesota
Lakes of Wright County, Minnesota